Harmațca (Harmatske, Garmatskoye) is a village in the Dubăsari District of Transnistria, Moldova. It has since 1990 been administered as a part or the breakaway Pridnestrovian Moldavian Republic (PMR).

References

Villages of Transnistria
Dubăsari District, Transnistria